Herculano de Oliveira (born 20 April 1946) is a Portuguese racing cyclist. He rode in the 1973 Tour de France.

References

1946 births
Living people
Portuguese male cyclists
Place of birth missing (living people)